Leones Dorados Fútbol Club is a Mexican professional football team based in Teziutlán, Puebla, Mexico currently playing in Liga de Balompié Mexicano.

History  
On July 20, 2020, the club was announced as the 17th founding franchise of the Liga de Balompié Mexicano, previously it had not appeared on the lists of teams interested in being part of the new league. In the beginning they had become the second team based in Mexico City.

After his official presentation, the team announced Florencio Martínez as its first manager. On July 29, the team signed Portuguese Luka Oliveira to reinforce their squad for the first tournament.

Due to the lack of support for the team in Mexico City, the club's board decided to look for a new venue where they could play their home games. Finally, an agreement was reached with the municipality of Teziutlán, with which the Leones Dorados took over the Municipal Stadium of the town, which had been remodeled recently, the field was left without a club after C.F. Zaragoza, which had announced it as its headquarters, was not accepted into the LBM.

Stadium
The Estadio Municipal de Teziutlán is situated in Teziutlán, Puebla, and is the ground of Leones Dorados F.C. which plays in the Liga de Balompié Mexicano. It has the capacity to hold 7,000 spectators. In 2020 it underwent a renovation to adapt it to the requirements of the LBM, among the improvement works were installed dressing rooms, showers, cyclonic mesh and a new grandstand, in addition to installing a storm drainage system for the maintenance of the court.

Originally, the team had announced that it would play at the Estadio Jesús Martínez "Palillo", located in the Ciudad Deportiva Magdalena Mixhuca of Mexico City. This field has a capacity for 6,000 spectators.

First-team squad

References

Association football clubs established in 2020
Football clubs in Puebla
2020 establishments in Mexico